Budhindranath Delihial Bhattacharya (1865 - 1945), also known as Budhi Babu, Budhindra Nath Bhattacharya, is renowned for his work The Pronouncing Anglo Assamese Dictionaries, which was first published in 1931. He was also a tea planter of The Crown of England, which later came under the Governments of Assam & West Bengal.

Early life and education
His father's name was Dharmadutta Bhattacharya, and his mother's name was Aai Keteki Devi, of Nowgong(Singia potani), Assam. Budhindranath left a volume of literary works as a dramatist, author, editor and lexicographer.

Budhindranath went to the Government High School, Nagaon, under the patronage of Rai Bahadur Gunabhiram Baruah. He was a talented student. In 1885, he passed the entrance examination and was admitted to the General Assembly Institution, nowadays called City College, Kolkata City College, where he earned a degree in fine arts. In Jaipur, he met Rai Bahadur Radhakanta Handique, Satyanath Bora, and other prominent personalities of pre-independent India who later became his close companions. Despite his talent, he had to leave his college education due to his family's financial situation.

Early professional life and King Edward VIIth's coronation
On 28 July 1888, after arriving at Jorhaat, Budhindranath started living in a small cottage  at the J. B. Road (Babu Ali). He began working as a school teacher at the Jorhaat Government High School while staying at the cottage. Later, he visited Dhaka, Shillong, and a few other places, after which, in 1893, he joined the Jorhat Court as the Criminal Peskar. A few years later, he was promoted to the position of head clerk on 17 November 1911 at the Office of the Deputy Commissioner in Jorhat. In 1894, he was given a piece of land by the then Sattradhikar (head monk) of the Garmur Sattra, near Malow Ali. He built a humble abode there and completed the construction process by 1897. In 1890, he married Rukmini (Golapi), daughter of Gadadhar Sarmah Borthakur of the Matigarung family. The couple had five sons and three daughters, who Kapindranath Bhattacharya saved, the sole survivor of Budhindranath's family.

Budhindranath visited England in 1902 as Raibahadur Jaggannath Baruah's secretary for Edward VII's coronation. His travelogue, Bilaat Jaatra, provides exciting glimpses of Britain and pre-independent India, especially Assam, at the beginning of the 20th century, before the start of the First World War.

Later professional life and the publication of the Pronouncing Anglo Assamese Dictionary
After his retirement in 1920, Budhindranath set up a small tea garden at Golaghat Dighalihula and started as an independent business person. A year later, in 1924, he was appointed valuer at the Golaghat Municipality Office. During this period, he was assigned as a Government translator to the East Bengal & Assam Governments. His contributions to the cause of Assamese culture and literature during this period were given recognition. In addition to being one of the founding members of the iconic Jorhat Theatre, he cared deeply about his country and Assamese literature in pre-independent India. He was also a member of the Society for the Progress of the Assamese Language. Under this, he contributed actively to the betterment of Assamese culture and society. Bhattacharya died at the age of 80.

Notable works
Dramas:
 Romoni Gabhoru (1895)
 Pandav Parichay
 Chitrangada Milan
 Chengeli Gaonburah

Books:
 The Scientific Essence of Hindu Religion
 Bilaat Probaxhi Asomiya

Newspapers and magazines to which he contributed his writing:
 Times of Assam
 Advocate of Assam
 Assam Bilashini
 Indian Mirror
 National Guardian
 Amritbazar
 Jayanti
 Journal of the Assam Sahitya Sabha

Newspapers (with Sahityarathna Chandradhar Baruah):
 Darpan

Dictionary:
 The Pronouncing Anglo Assamese Dictionary (First Edition, 14 October 1931)

References

The Pronouncing Anglo Assamese Dictionary by Budhindranath Bhattacharya|Smoronik - A tribute to Lexicographer Budhindranath Delihial Bhattacharya=Compiled by Jorhat Theatre, edited by Santantu Thakur, printed and published by Abhijit Bhattacharya at New Era Media Services, Jorhat, 2003.

1865 births
1945 deaths
City College, Kolkata alumni
Indian dramatists and playwrights
Indian editors
Indian lexicographers
Indian male writers